Art Blakey and the Jazz Messengers (album) may refer to:

 Art Blakey's Jazz Messengers with Thelonious Monk, a 1958 album
 Art Blakey and the Jazz Messengers, a 1961 album also stylized as Art Blakey!!!!! Jazz Messengers!!!!!
 The Jazz Messengers, a 1956 album
 Moanin', a 1959 album alternatively titled Art Blakey and the Jazz Messengers